La Sera is an American indie rock band formed by Katy Goodman, the bassist for Vivian Girls, in 2010. They have released four albums and toured internationally.

History
La Sera, whose name means "the evening" in Italian, started in 2010, with Goodman writing songs and Brady Hall producing.  The video for their first single "Never Come Around" was released on Halloween 2010. Following the release of their self-titled debut album in February 2011, La Sera toured the US with Tennis and Europe with Jenny Lewis.

La Sera's second studio album Sees the Light, released in March 2012, was produced by Rob Barbato (Darker My Love). The album's opening track, "Love That's Gone", is featured in the music video game Rocksmith 2014.  Following the release of Sees the Light, the band toured the US with Father John Misty. In 2012, Todd Wisenbaker joined the band, which at that time also included Nate Lotz on drums and Greta Morgan on rhythm guitar. Around the same time, Goodman moved from Brooklyn to Los Angeles.

La Sera released their third album, Hour of the Dawn, in May 2014. It was produced by Todd Wisenbaker (Whispertown 2000,  Jenny and Johnny) and engineered by Joel Jerome (Babies on Acid, Dios) during the summer of 2013. In contrast to previous records, Goodman worked with the other band members on the songs, noting that they "all worked on the new record for about a year, writing and editing". During production, the band decided to make the album's sound "'80s rock. The Smiths, The Pretenders". Wisenbaker contributed the song "10 Headed Goat Wizard" and described the album as "a classic American record". The critical reaction described Hour of the Dawn as having "new-found optimism".

La Sera toured with Kate Nash and The Julie Ruin in Fall 2013 to promote the album. After the album's release, the band did a full European tour with Springtime Carnivore, which ended at Primavera Festival. La Sera also did a West Coast tour with King Tuff, and the show on November 6, 2014 was filmed to air on Last Call with Carson Daly. Three songs, "Please Be My Third Eye," "Fall in Place," and "10 Headed Goat Wizard", were aired on Last Call on March 17, 2015. The music video for "Fall in Place" was premiered by Entertainment Weekly on June 11, 2014.

In March 2016, La Sera released the Ryan Adams-produced Music For Listening To Music To through Polyvinyl. The album's release was preceded by the single "High Notes" in December 2015. The album's second single, "I Need an Angel", was released in March 2016.

Goodman worked with Greta Morgan on a collection of punk covers with '60s pop arrangements that was released as Take It, It's Yours through Polyvinyl in August 2016.

Personal life 
Goodman is originally from New Jersey.

She is married to Todd Wisenbaker and lives in Los Angeles.

Technical career 
Goodman has a bachelor's degree in physics and a master's in education of physics from Rutgers, and worked as a part-time coder for CASH Music.

Discography

Studio albums

Singles

Music videos

References

Dream pop musical groups
Hardly Art artists
Indie rock musical groups from California
Musical groups from Los Angeles